Richard John Overson (born 3 June 1959) is an English former professional footballer who played as a central defender. He appeared in the Football League for Hereford United and Burnley, where his brother, Vince, was on the books at the same time. After retiring from football he joined the police.

References

1959 births
Living people
Sportspeople from Kettering
English footballers
Association football defenders
Burnley F.C. players
Hereford United F.C. players
Gloucester City A.F.C. players
English Football League players